Carlos Granda is a reporter for KABC-TV News in Los Angeles.

Background 

Carlos Granda holds a Bachelor's degree in Mass Communications and Broadcast Journalism from the University of South Florida. He became interested in journalism after watching Walter Cronkite on the news. When he was a child, Carlos Granda was impressed by how articulate and poised Walter Cronkite was.

Career 

Granda began his career in television news at WINK-TV, the CBS affiliate in Fort Myers, Florida where he joined as an associate producer. Later he became a full-time reporter for the station.

Moving to Miami-based WLTV-TV in 1985, Granda covered a number of major events, including Queen Elizabeth's visit to the Bahamas, the Statue of Liberty Centennial in New York, and the crash of a Delta plane in Dallas.

After two years at WLTV-TV, Granda moved in 1987 to cover Central American issues at Miami-based ABC-TV affiliate, WPLG-TV.

In 1990,  Granda moved to New-York based WABC-TV to work as a general assignment reporter and fill-in anchor for "Eyewitness News this Morning".

His next move was to New-York based WNBC-TV in late 1993 as its New Jersey correspondent.

In 1995, Granda returned to Miami to become an anchor at WFOR-TV the CBS affiliate.  He joined ABC7 as a general assignment reporter in April 1998.

At KABC, Granda has covered some of the biggest stories in Southern California. He has reported on the 2000 Democratic and Republican Conventions, Election Day in Austin Texas, Elian Gonzalez's deportation and The World Trade Center Attack, and several stories about the Al Qaeda prisoners at the Guantanamo Naval Base in Cuba.

Awards 

Granda has been nominated for five Emmy awards. He won an Emmy for his series on the homeless called "My Home is the Street".

References

Living people
Emmy Award winners
1961 births
University of South Florida alumni